Cribrodyschirius is a genus of beetles in the family Carabidae, containing the following species:

 Cribrodyschirius basilewskyi Fedorenko, 1991
 Cribrodyschirius congoensis (E. Rousseau, 1905)
 Cribrodyschirius gibbicollis (Fairmaire, 1897)
 Cribrodyschirius guineensis Fedorenko, 1999
 Cribrodyschirius jeanneli (Basilewsky, 1948)
 Cribrodyschirius mocquerysi (Jeannel, 1946)
 Cribrodyschirius porosus Putzeys, 1877
 Cribrodyschirius puncticollis (Péringuey, 1896)

References

Scaritinae